1947 Meistaradeildin was the fifth season of Meistaradeildin, the top tier of the Faroese football league system. It was the first time the competition was played in a league format. SÍ Sørvágur won its first and only championship.

League table

Results

References

External links
Faroe Islands Premier League at Faroe Soccer (choose 1947)
Faroe Islands League Final Tables by webalice.it
Faroese champions by RSSSF

Meistaradeildin seasons
Faroe
Faroe